Kickin' Game is the second studio album by American hip hop duo Havoc & Prodeje of South Central Cartel. It was released on October 25, 1994 through G.W.K. Records and Pump Records with distribution via Warlock Records for Quality Records. Recording sessions took place at Echo Sound and Kitchen Sync Studio in Los Angeles. The album peaked at number 59 on the Top R&B/Hip-Hop Albums, thus making it their only release to make it to the Billboard charts.

Track listing
"Intro"- 0:54  
"Charge It 2 a Bitch"- 5:07  
"Kickin' Game"- 3:38  
"That's the Way It'z Goin' Down"- 3:54  
"Guess-A-Dad"- 1:30  
"2 G R Not 2 G"- 4:01  
"All I'm C'in iz G'z"- 4:01  
"Endo Glide"- 4:12  
"G'z on da Move"- 3:58  
"Block 2 Block"- 4:45  
"C U When U Get Out"- 4:26  
"Only Lonely Homie"- 4:31  
"Now I Lay Me Down"- 3:45  
"M-Squads Nation Wide"- 6:02  
"G'z Only"- 4:00  
"Outro"- 3:13

Chart history

References

External links

1994 albums
Havoc & Prodeje albums
South Central Cartel albums
Albums produced by Prodeje
G-funk albums
Gangsta rap albums by American artists
West Coast hip hop albums